Eric Fraser (born May 5, 1987) is a professional Canadian football defensive back retired of the Canadian Football League (CFL). He was drafted as the eighth overall selection by the Calgary Stampeders in the first round of the 2009 CFL Draft. He was selected in the 2013 CFL expansion draft by the Ottawa Redblacks and played one season for the team before signing with his hometown Lions on July 14, 2015. He played high school football at Burnaby Central Secondary School and played college football for the Central Michigan University Chippewas of the Mid-American Conference.

External links
Fraser leaves Calgary with unfinished business, but he’s embracing new opportunity in Ottawa
Ottawa Redblacks bio 
BC Lions bio 

1987 births
Living people
BC Lions players
Calgary Stampeders players
Canadian players of American football
Canadian football defensive backs
Central Michigan Chippewas football players
Ottawa Redblacks players
Players of Canadian football from British Columbia
Sportspeople from Burnaby